Axel Orrström (born 13 April 1986) is a Finnish footballer who plays for AC Oulu.

Orrström played for Atlantis FC until November 2007  and joined Scottish side Dumbarton in January 2008, leaving in April 2008, making a total of seven appearances. Orrström later signed for AC Oulu.

Orrström is a former Finnish youth international.

External links

References

1986 births
Living people
Finnish expatriate footballers
Finnish footballers
Atlantis FC players
Dumbarton F.C. players
AC Oulu players
Scottish Football League players
Association football midfielders
Footballers from Helsinki